The 1835 Middlesex County, New Jersey tornado of Friday, June 19, 1835, was the deadliest tornado recorded in New Jersey history. It destroyed all but two of twelve houses in Piscataway and killed five in New Brunswick, where it struck what is now part of downtown along a path through (or near) what is now Robert Wood Johnson University Hospital property, the site of Monument Square, and George Street.

Reporting

See also
List of North American tornadoes and tornado outbreaks
List of New Jersey tornadoes
1989 Northeastern United States tornado outbreak (produced three tornadoes in New Jersey)

References

Tornado outbreaks with no Fujita scale ratings given
New Brunswick, New Jersey
Piscataway, New Jersey
Tornadoes in New Jersey
June 1835 events
1835 natural disasters in the United States
1835 in New Jersey
1835 meteorology
Tornadoes of 1835